Euphaedra lupercoides is a butterfly in the family Nymphalidae first described by Walter Rothschild in 1918. It is found in the Republic of the Congo, the Democratic Republic of the Congo and the Central African Republic.

References

Butterflies described in 1979
lupercoides